The Starokozache Solar Park is a 42.95 MW photovoltaic power located in the Odessa Oblast in southern Ukraine.

See also 

 List of largest power stations in the world
 List of photovoltaic power stations

References 

Photovoltaic power stations in Ukraine
Buildings and structures in Odesa Oblast